HMS K4 was a British K-class submarine built by Vickers in Barrow-in-Furness. She was laid down on 28 June 1915 and commissioned on 1 January 1917, one year before the end of World War I.

Accidents

January 1917

In January 1917 HMS K4 ran aground on Walney Island. The British submarine giant was stranded on its beach but was undamaged. She was refloated the next day.

17 November 1917 
On 17 November 1917, K4 collided with sister ship  during an accident off the Danish coast. The light cruiser  operating with K1 had to make a sharp turn to avoid three units from the 4th Cruiser Squadron. And in the confusion, K4 collided with K1. The crew of K1 were rescued and K1 sunk by the Blonde. The K4 was under the command of Lieutenant-Commander Alfred Fenner. There is a blue plaque on the wall of his home in the town of Cromer in Norfolk.

Loss 
K4 was lost on 31 January 1918 during the night time fleet exercises later known as the Battle of May Island (Operation E.C.1) when she was attached to the 13th Submarine Flotilla. She was lost with all hands. The wreck is designated as a protected place under the Protection of Military Remains Act 1986.

Bibliography 
Notes

References 
  - Total pages: 160

Publications

External links
 'Submarine losses 1904 to present day' - Royal Navy Submarine Museum 

 

Ships built in Barrow-in-Furness
British K-class submarines
Protected Wrecks of the United Kingdom
World War I shipwrecks in the North Sea
British submarine accidents
Maritime incidents in 1917
Maritime incidents in 1918
Submarines sunk in collisions
1916 ships
Royal Navy ship names
Warships lost with all hands
Submarines sunk by submarines